Ishliki (also Romanized as Īshīkī; also known as Eshlīkī, Ishlik, Ishlyk, and Lashīkī) is a village in Kurka Rural District, in the Central District of Astaneh-ye Ashrafiyeh County, Gilan Province, Iran. At the 2006 census, its population was 174, in 51 families.

References 

Populated places in Astaneh-ye Ashrafiyeh County